The Henry Swan House is a historic house in Arlington, Massachusetts.  The -story wood-frame house was built in 1888 by Henry Swan, a Boston poultry dealer who was also active in local politics.  The house is a well-preserved example of the sort of late Victorian houses that were once much more typical along Massachusetts Avenue.

The house was listed on the National Register of Historic Places in 1985, and was also included that year in an expansion of the Arlington Center Historic District.

See also
National Register of Historic Places listings in Arlington, Massachusetts

References

Houses on the National Register of Historic Places in Arlington, Massachusetts
Houses completed in 1888
Houses in Arlington, Massachusetts
Historic district contributing properties in Massachusetts